Campaign Politics is a Canadian television show which airs on CPAC during federal elections. The program features CPAC journalists and hosts profiling different Canadian electoral districts, including feature interviews with the major party candidates, campaign volunteers and voters in the district.

2004 election
The following ridings were profiled during the 2004 election:

Dartmouth—Cole Harbour: Susan MacAlpine-Gillis (NDP), Michael Savage (Liberal), Michael MacDonald (Conservative)
Kings—Hants
Fredericton: Andy Scott (Liberal), John Carty (NDP)
Saint John
Ottawa Centre
Ottawa South
Newmarket—Aurora: Belinda Stronach (Conservative), Martha Hall Findlay (Liberal), Ed Chudak (NDP), Dorian Baxter (Progressive Canadian Party)
Toronto—Danforth
York West: Judy Sgro (Liberal), Sandra Romano Anthony (NDP), Leslie Soobrian (Conservative), Joseph Grubb (Christian Heritage Party)
Hamilton East—Stoney Creek
Thunder Bay—Rainy River: Ken Boshcoff (Liberal), John Rafferty (NDP), David Leskowski (Conservative)
Winnipeg North: Judy Wasylycia-Leis (NDP), Rey Pagtakhan (Liberal), Alon Weinberg (Green)
Charleswood—St. James: Glen Murray (Liberal), Steven Fletcher (Conservative), Peter Carney (NDP)
Saskatoon—Wanuskewin: Maurice Vellacott (Conservative), Chris Axworthy (Liberal), Priscilla Settee (NDP)
Lethbridge: Rick Casson (Conservative), Ken Nicol (Liberal), Melanee Thomas (NDP), Ken Vanden Broek (CHP)
Edmonton—Strathcona: Rahim Jaffer (Conservative), Debby Carlson (Liberal), Malcolm Azania (NDP)
Chilliwack—Fraser Canyon: Chuck Strahl (Conservative), Bob Besner (Liberal), Rollie Keith (NDP), Ron Gray (CHP)
Burnaby—Douglas: Bill Siksay (NDP), Bill Cunningham (Liberal), George Drazenovic (Conservative)
Vancouver Kingsway: David Emerson (Liberal), Ian Waddell (NDP), Jesse Johl (Conservative), Tracey Mann (Green)

2006 election
The following ridings were profiled during the 2006 election:

Avalon
St. John's South—Mount Pearl: Loyola Hearn (Conservative), Peg Norman (NDP)
Dartmouth—Cole Harbour: Michael Savage (Liberal), Peter Mancini (NDP)
South Shore—St. Margaret's: Gerald Keddy (Conservative), Gordon Earle (NDP)
West Nova: Robert Thibault (Liberal), Arthur Bull (NDP), Matt Granger (Green)
Prince Edward Island (all four ridings profiled in one show)
Saint John: Terry Albright (NDP)
Fredericton: John Carty (NDP)
Chicoutimi—Le Fjord
Louis-Saint-Laurent: Bernard Cleary (BQ), Josée Verner (Conservative)
Brome—Missisquoi: Heward Grafftey (Progressive Canadian Party)
Beauce
Jeanne-Le Ber: Liza Frulla (Liberal), Thierry St-Cyr (BQ)
Outremont: Jean-Paul Lauzon (NDP)
Papineau: Pierre Pettigrew (Liberal)
Gatineau: Françoise Boivin (Liberal)
Ottawa Centre: Paul Dewar (NDP), Richard Mahoney (Liberal), David Chernushenko (Green)
Ottawa West—Nepean: Marlene Rivier (NDP)
Northumberland—Quinte West
Newmarket—Aurora: Belinda Stronach (Liberal), Lois Brown (Conservative), Ed Chudak (NDP)
Whitby—Ajax
Beaches—East York: Maria Minna (Liberal), Marilyn Churley (NDP), Peter Conroy (Conservatives), Jim Harris (Green)
St. Paul's: Carolyn Bennett (Liberal), Peter Kent (Conservative), Paul Summerville (NDP)
Trinity—Spadina: Olivia Chow (NDP), Tony Ianno (Liberal)
Parkdale—High Park: Peggy Nash (NDP)
Etobicoke—Lakeshore: Michael Ignatieff (Liberal), John Capobianco (Conservative), Liam McHugh-Russell (NDP)
Hamilton Mountain: Chris Charlton (NDP)
Haldimand—Norfolk: Diane Finley (Conservative), Bob Speller (Liberal)
London—Fanshawe: Irene Mathyssen (NDP)
Middlesex—Kent—Lambton: Bev Shipley (Conservative)
Sault Ste. Marie: Tony Martin (NDP)
Selkirk—Interlake
Kildonan—St. Paul
Charleswood—St. James—Assiniboia: Steven Fletcher (Conservative)
Palliser: Dave Batters (Conservative), Jo-Ann Dusel (NDP), John Williams (Liberal)
Regina—Qu'Appelle: Lorne Nystrom (NDP), Andrew Scheer (Conservative), Allyce Herle (Liberal)
Desnethé—Missinippi—Churchill River: Anita Jackson (NDP), Jeremy Harrison (Conservative)
Saskatoon—Humboldt: Brad Trost (Conservative), Andrew Mason (NDP)
Saskatoon—Rosetown—Biggar: Carol Skelton (Conservative), Nettie Wiebe (NDP), Myron Luczka (Liberal)
Edmonton—Mill Woods—Beaumont
Calgary North Centre: Jim Prentice (Conservative), John Chan (NDP), Mark MacGillivray (Green)
Burnaby—New Westminster: Peter Julian (NDP), Mary Pynenburg (Liberal)
Burnaby—Douglas: Bill Siksay (NDP), Bill Cunningham (Liberal)
Newton—North Delta: Nancy Clegg (NDP)
New Westminster—Coquitlam: Paul Forseth (Conservative), Dawn Black (NDP), Joyce Murray (Liberal)
North Vancouver: Don Bell (Liberal), Cindy Silver (Conservative)
Vancouver Centre: Hedy Fry (Liberal), Svend Robinson (NDP)
West Vancouver—Sunshine Coast: Blair Wilson (Liberal)
Esquimalt—Juan de Fuca: Keith Martin (Liberal), Randall Garrison (NDP)
Victoria: David Mulroney (Liberal), Ariel Lade (Green)
Yukon: Larry Bagnell (Liberal), Pam Boyde (NDP)

2008 election
Central Nova: Peter Mackay (Conservative), Elizabeth May (Green), Louise Lorefice (NDP)
Edmonton Centre:
Guelph: Mike Nagy (Green)
Halton
Papineau: Vivian Barbot (BQ), Justin Trudeau (Liberal), Ingrid Hein (Green), Mustaque Sarker (Conservative)
Parkdale—High Park: Peggy Nash (NDP), Gerard Kennedy (Liberal), (Green), (Conservative)
Parry Sound—Muskoka: Tony Clement (Conservative), Glen Hodgson (Green), Jamie McGarvey (Liberal), Jo-Anne Boulding (NDP)
Saint-Lambert
St. John's East: Jack Harris (NDP), (Conservative), (Liberal), (Green)
Thornhill: Susan Kadis (Liberal), Peter Kent (Conservative), Simon Strelchik (NDP), Norbert Koehl (Green)
Thunder Bay—Superior North: Bev Sarafin (Conservative), Bruce Hyer (NDP), Don McArthur (Liberal), Brendan Hughes (Green)
Vaudreuil-Soulanges
West Vancouver—Sunshine Coast—Sea to Sky Country:
Westmount—Ville-Marie

References

2004 Canadian television series debuts
2000s Canadian television news shows
Canadian political television series
2000s Canadian documentary television series